Nepenthes macfarlanei (after John Muirhead Macfarlane, botanist) is a carnivorous pitcher plant species endemic to Peninsular Malaysia. It produces attractive red-speckled pitchers. Lower pitchers are ovoid or infundibular in the lower half and globose or cylindrical above and up to 25 cm high. Upper (aerial) pitchers are of a lighter colour with wings reduced to ribs. The lower surface of the lid is densely covered with short, white hairs.  This is a characteristic morphological feature of this species, but at present its function is unknown.

Natural hybrids

The following natural hybrids involving N. macfarlanei have been recorded.

N. macfarlanei × N. ramispina
N. macfarlanei × N. sanguinea

References

Further reading

 Bauer, U., C.J. Clemente, T. Renner & W. Federle 2012. Form follows function: morphological diversification and alternative trapping strategies in carnivorous Nepenthes pitcher plants. Journal of Evolutionary Biology 25(1): 90–102. 
 Bourke, G. 2003.  Carniflora Australis (2): 23–26.
 Clarke, C.M. 2006. Introduction. In: Danser, B.H. The Nepenthaceae of the Netherlands Indies. Natural History Publications (Borneo), Kota Kinabalu. pp. 1–15.
 Clarke, C. & C.C. Lee 2012. A revision of Nepenthes (Nepenthaceae) from Gunung Tahan, Peninsular Malaysia. Gardens' Bulletin Singapore 64(1): 33–49.
 Chua, L.S.L. 1995. Conservation studies with Nepenthes macfarlanei Hemsl. in Peninsular Malaysia. Ph.D. thesis, University of Bath, London. 200 pp.
 Chua, L.S.L. 2000. The flowering phenology and floral biology of Nepenthes macfarlanei (Nepenthaceae) from Mt. Purun, Peninsular Malaysia. Journal of Tropical Forest Science 12(2): 197–206.
 Chua, L.S.L. 2000. The pollination biology and breeding system of Nepenthes macfarlanei (Nepenthaceae). Journal of Tropical Forest Science 12(4): 635–642.
 Macfarlane, J.M. 1914. Family XCVI. Nepenthaceæ. [pp. 279–288] In: J.S. Gamble. Materials for a flora of the Malayan Peninsula, No. 24. Journal & Proceedings of the Asiatic Society of Bengal 75(3): 279–391.
  Mansur, M. 2001.  In: Prosiding Seminar Hari Cinta Puspa dan Satwa Nasional. Lembaga Ilmu Pengetahuan Indonesia, Bogor. pp. 244–253.
 McPherson, S.R. & A. Robinson 2012. Field Guide to the Pitcher Plants of Peninsular Malaysia and Indochina. Redfern Natural History Productions, Poole.
 Meimberg, H., P. Dittrich, G. Bringmann, J. Schlauer & G. Heubl 2000. Molecular phylogeny of Caryophyllidae s.l. based on matK sequences with special emphasis on carnivorous taxa. Plant Biology 2(2): 218–228. 
 Meimberg, H., A. Wistuba, P. Dittrich & G. Heubl 2001. Molecular phylogeny of Nepenthaceae based on cladistic analysis of plastid trnK intron sequence data. Plant Biology 3(2): 164–175. 
  Meimberg, H. 2002.  Ph.D. thesis, Ludwig Maximilian University of Munich, Munich.
 Meimberg, H. & G. Heubl 2006. Introduction of a nuclear marker for phylogenetic analysis of Nepenthaceae. Plant Biology 8(6): 831–840. 
 Meimberg, H., S. Thalhammer, A. Brachmann & G. Heubl 2006. Comparative analysis of a translocated copy of the trnK intron in carnivorous family Nepenthaceae. Molecular Phylogenetics and Evolution 39(2): 478–490. 
 Renner, T. & C.D. Specht 2011. A sticky situation: assessing adaptations for plant carnivory in the Caryophyllales by means of stochastic character mapping. International Journal of Plant Sciences 172(7): 889–901. 
 Ridley, H.N. 1909. Nepenthaceæ. [p. 59] In: The flora of the Telôm and Batang Padang valleys. Journal of the Federated Malay States Museums 4(1): 1–98.
 Ridley, H.N. 1915. Nepenthaceæ. [pp. 168–169] In: XIII. The botany of Gunong Tahan, Pahang. Journal of the Federated Malay States Museums 6: 127–202.
 Schmid-Hollinger, R. 1997.   Carnivorous Plant Newsletter 26(2): 46–50.
  Schmid-Hollinger, R. 2010. Nepenthes macfarlanei: Ameisennest in alter Kanne. Das Taublatt 66: 39–42. 
  Schmid-Hollinger, R. N.d. Kannenpflanzen, Nepenthaceae. bio-schmidhol.ch. 
 Shivas, R.G. 1983.   Carnivorous Plant Newsletter 12(3): 65–67.
 Thorogood, C. 2010. The Malaysian Nepenthes: Evolutionary and Taxonomic Perspectives. Nova Science Publishers, New York.
 Tökés, Z.A., W.C. Woon & S.M. Chambers 1974. Digestive enzymes secreted by the carnivorous plant Nepenthes macferlanei. Planta 119(1): 39–46. 
 Yeo, J. 1996. A trip to Cameron Highlands. Bulletin of the Australian Carnivorous Plant Society, Inc. 15(3): 17–18.
 Nepenthes of Peninsula Malaysia by Stewart McPherson

Carnivorous plants of Asia
macfarlanei
Endemic flora of Peninsular Malaysia
Plants described in 1905